Nadi Football Club is a Fijian football club based in Nadi that competes in the Fiji Premier League. Their home stadium is Prince Charles.

History
Nadi Football Club was founded in 1937 under the leadership of Edward Grant. The local competition held during the year included the teams: Koronubu, Sabeto, Bhartiya and Votualevu. Nadi played for the first time in the Inter-district competition in 1939, when it beat Nadroga in the preliminary round by 2 goals to nil but lost to Rewa in the semi-final by the same margin.

Nadi are 8-time champions of Fiji. Nadi won the Inter-District Championship (IDC) for the first time in 1969 under the Presidency of Cr. Shri Venkanna Chetty. They have won their last two IDC finals (against Lautoka 3–1 in 1998 and Ba 1–0 in 1999), which came after their last IDC win in 1974. Nadi qualified for the championship after a 3-team playoff with Ba and Labasa. Ba were favourites to win the play-offs but were upset in the first match against Labasa by 3–0. Nadi then beat Labasa by 3–0 and Ba 1–0 to qualify for the Oceania Club Championship.

1999 Oceania Club Championship
In the Championship, which they hosted, Nadi beat New Zealand's Central United 1–0 in the semi finals courtesy of a Marika Namaqa free kick.  Nadi, an amateur team, then lost the final to Australia's South Melbourne FC, a professional outfit, by 5–1.  This match was played in heavy rain, with South Melbourne scoring 3 penalty kicks. Nadi's lone goal was scored by Watisoni Voli.

The next year in 2000, Nadi went undefeated in the National League by winning 17 of the 18 games and drawing one against Ba.

Achievements
 League Championship (for Districts) : 9
 1978, 1980, 1981, 1982, 1983, 1985, 1998, 2000, 2015.

 Inter-District Championship : 6
 1969, 1971, 1974, 1998, 1999, 2002.

Battle of the Giants : 5
 1978, 1980, 1983, 1986, 1996.

Fiji Football Association Cup Tournament : 5
 1996, 2013, 2014, 2016, 2019.
Runner-up 1: 2017.

Champion versus Champion: 1
 2015.

Performance in OFC competitions
Oceania Club Championship (1 appearance)
 1999 – Finalist – Lost against South Melbourne FC  (stage 3 of 3)

Current squad

See also
 Fiji Football Association

References

Bibliography
M. Prasad, Sixty Years of Soccer in Fiji 1938–1998: The Official History of the Fiji Football Association, Fiji Football Association, Suva, 1998.

Football clubs in Fiji
1937 establishments in Fiji